Revisited is an album of remixed or re-recorded tracks from British folk musician Ralph McTell's albums Spiral Staircase and My Side of Your Window. Produced by Gus Dudgeon, it was originally intended for release in the United States, but in the event was released in the UK. Although the album has never had a CD release in its own right, all tracks are now available on All Things Change: The Transatlantic Anthology on CD.

Track listing
All titles by Ralph McTell.

Side One
"Streets of London" - 4:00
"Michael in the Garden" - 4;20
"Last Train and Ride" - 3:30
"Kew Gardens" - 2;15
"Fairground" - 3:55

Side Two
"Spiral Staircase" - 3:10
"Factory Girl" - 5:50
"Bright and Beautiful Things" - 1:55
"Father Forgive Them" - 2:25
"Clown" - 3;15
"Terminus" - 1:55

Personnel
Ralph McTell - guitar, vocals
For other musicians see Spiral Staircase and My Side of Your Window.

Production credits
Producer: Gus Dudgeon
Photography - Keith Morris
Liner notes: Ralph McTell

Release history

Many of the tracks on this album also feature in the Spiral Staircase - Classic Songs compilation.

References

Ralph McTell albums
Albums produced by Gus Dudgeon
1970 remix albums
Transatlantic Records remix albums